Thomas Kilbride (28 April 1911 – 30 August 1986) was an Irish Fine Gael politician, who was a member of Seanad Éireann from 1973 to 1981. He was elected to the Seanad by the Administrative Panel in 1973 and re-elected in 1977.

References

1911 births
1986 deaths
Members of the 13th Seanad
Members of the 14th Seanad
Fine Gael senators